Jasper Van Der Heyden (born 3 July 1995) is a Belgian professional footballer who plays for 07 Vestur in the Faroe Islands. He is a fast winger that uses both feet and is the son of Stephan Van Der Heyden.

Career
He made his top flight debut with Lierse at age 17 during the 2012–13 season. From 2018–19 he played for the Icelandic club Þróttur. In 2020 he played for the Faroese club AB Argir and the following season in January 2021 he signed a one-year contract with Faroese champions from the 2019 season KÍ Klaksvík.

Honours
KÍ
 Faroe Islands Premier League: 2021

References

External links
 Jasper Van Der Heyden at Footballdatabase

1995 births
Living people
Belgian footballers
Belgian expatriate footballers
Lierse S.K. players
AS Verbroedering Geel players
Knattspyrnufélagið Þróttur players
Argja Bóltfelag players
KÍ Klaksvík players
07 Vestur players
Belgian Pro League players
Challenger Pro League players
Faroe Islands Premier League players
Association football wingers
Expatriate footballers in Iceland
Expatriate footballers in the Faroe Islands
Belgian expatriate sportspeople in the Faroe Islands
Hoogstraten VV players